Hewani is a settlement in Kenya's Coast Province.

Location 
The village of Hewani is located within Tana River District.

Ecology 
The Ministry of Agriculture commissioned a report about the proposed Hewani Irrigation Scheme in 1979.

Farming and forestry have negatively affected the red colobus population in Hewani, which had notably declined when assessed in 2003.

See also 

 Tana River Primate National Reserve
 Tana River (Kenya)

References 

Populated places in Coast Province
Populated places in Tana River County